Ku Kaeo is a district (amphoe) in central Udon Thani province, northeastern Thailand.

Geography
Neighboring districts are (from the north clockwise): Nong Han, Chai Wan, Si That, Kumphawapi, and Prachaksinlapakhom.

History
The minor district (king amphoe) was established on 30 April 1994 by splitting it from Nong Han district.

On 15 May 2007 all 81 Thai minor districts were upgraded to full districts. On 24 August the upgrade became official.

Administration
The district is divided into four sub-districts (tambons), which are further subdivided into 37 villages (mubans). There are no municipal (thesaban) areas, and four tambon administrative organizations (TAO).

References

External links
amphoe.com

Ku Kaeo